Astrothelium pictum is a species of corticolous (bark-dwelling), crustose lichen in the family Trypetheliaceae. Found in Brazil, it was formally described as a new species in 2016 by Dutch lichenologist André Aptroot.

The presence of the lichen induces the formation of galls in the bark of the host. The ascomata are spherical, measuring about 0.8–1.2 mm in diameter. The thallus contains lichexanthone, a lichen product that causes this structure to fluoresce yellow when lit with a long-wavelength UV light. The lichen also contains an anthraquinone that is detectable using thin-layer chromatography, and visible as reddish crystals in the pseudostromata. The main characteristics of the lichen that distinguish it from other members of Astrothelium include the septation and size of its ascospores (usually 5-septate and 90–115 μm long); the presence of external purplish-red pigment on the ascomata; and the laterally scattered arrangement of the ascomata along pseudostromata. Astrothelium sipmanii is somewhat similar in appearance, but, unlike A. pictum, that species has an inspersed .

References

pictum
Lichen species
Lichens described in 2016
Taxa named by André Aptroot
Lichens of Brazil